The Château de Frankenbourg is a ruined 12th century castle in the commune of Neubois in the Bas-Rhin département in Alsace, France.

The castle is state-owned. It has been listed since 1898 as a monument historique by the French Ministry of Culture.

See also
List of castles in France
Chateau

References

External links
 

Ruined castles in Bas-Rhin